Sertularella ellisii is a branching colonial hydroid in the family Sertulariidae.

Description
This hydroid grows as a sparsely branched colony to 3 cm in height.

Distribution
Described from the north-east Atlantic Ocean.

References

Sertularellidae
Animals described in 1836